Fernando Tocornal Linares (born 26 June 1961) is a Spanish former professional footballer who played as a centre back, or occasionally a midfielder.

Career

Tocornal was born in Laredo in the autonomous community of Cantabria, but began his career in the youth teams of Asturian club Sporting de Gijón. He began to feature for the B team, Sporting de Gijón Atlético, during 1979–80, suffering relegation from Segunda División B in his first season. The following season, he was part of the team that won their Tercera División group and earned promotion at the first attempt. He made his La Liga debut for the first team in 1980–81, which came on 29 November in a 2–1 away loss to Athletic Bilbao at San Mamés. He played the first 64 minutes before being replaced by Pedro González.

The following season, Tocornal returned to Atlético, where he added some more silverware as they won the Copa de la Liga Segunda División B. He spent 1983–84 on loan with Palencia, who were relegated from the Segunda División that year. He returned to play in the top flight again with Sporting the following year, making 23 appearances. He left the club on another season-long in the summer of 1985, joining Real Murcia, and helped them win the Segunda División title and earn promotion to the top flight. He left Sporting for good in January 1987, joining Real Oviedo in the second tier. In his first full season with Oviedo, they won promotion to La Liga, although Tocornal played only twice in the ensuing campaign.

Tocornal joined Real Burgos in 1989, and in his first season he won the second Segunda División title of his career, and was promoted to the top flight for the third time. He played 50 matches for Burgos over the next two seasons in the top division, before signing from Compostela ahead of the 1992–93 Segunda División season. A fourth La Liga promotion followed in 1993–94, and he continued to be a regular starter during the next two seasons. He was a key part of the side that recorded Compostela's best ever league result, finishing 10th in 1995–96. Tocornal joined Badajoz in the summer of 1996, coming under the management of his former Gijón teammate Antonio Maceda. After two seasons with Badajoz, Tocornal saw out his career by spending the 1998–99 season at Lealtad, before retiring that summer as he reached his 38th birthday. Between his spells with Gijón, Oviedo, Burgos and Compostela, he amassed 146 La Liga appearances, scoring three goals.

Honours
Sporting de Gijón Atlético
Tercera División: 1980–81
Copa de la Liga Segunda División B: 1983

Real Murcia
Segunda División: 1985–86

Real Burgos
Segunda División: 1989–90

Career statistics

1. Appearances in the 1983 Copa de la Liga Segunda División B
2. Appearances in the 1985 Copa de la Liga
3. Appearances in the 1984 Copa de la Liga Segunda División
4. Appearance in the 1987–88 Segunda División promotion playoff
5. Appearance in the 1993–94 Segunda División promotion playoff

References

External links

1961 births
Living people
People from Laredo, Cantabria
Footballers from Cantabria
Spanish footballers
Association football defenders
Association football midfielders
La Liga players
Segunda División players
Segunda División B players
Tercera División players
Sporting de Gijón B players
Sporting de Gijón players
Palencia CF players
Real Murcia players
Real Oviedo players
Real Burgos CF footballers
SD Compostela footballers
CD Badajoz players
CD Lealtad players